Gyula Hegedűs (born 25 February 1980 in Budapest) is a Hungarian football (defender) player who currently plays for Veszprém FC.

References 
HLSZ 
Nemzeti Sport 

1980 births
Living people
Footballers from Budapest
Hungarian footballers
Association football defenders
Vasas SC players
BKV Előre SC footballers
BFC Siófok players
Debreceni VSC players
Diósgyőri VTK players
Szolnoki MÁV FC footballers
Veszprém LC footballers